Saeksan Or. Kwanmuang (เสกสรร อ.ขวัญเมือง) is a Thai Muay Thai fighter, originally from Nakhon Si Thammarat in the South of Thailand.

Saeksan started to train Muay Thai in a camp near of his home at the age of 9. He was introduced to the sport by his father and his older brother, who was also a fighter.

Saeksan is known as a Muay Bouk fighter (a Muay Thai fighter who always advances and is most focused on aggressive punching and elbow combinations); this fighting style helped turn him into a well-known fighter on the sporting circuit, receiving the nickname of Kon Mai Yom Kon (The Man Who Yields to No One)

In July 2016, Saeksan Or. Kwanmuang was ranked the #7 Super-feather weight ranked on Rajadamnern Stadium by muaythai2000.com, also ranked #7 Super Feather weight on Channel 7 Stadium by muaythai2000.com

In September 2016, Saeksan Or. Kwanmuang was ranked the #4 Super-feather weight in the world by wbcmuaythai.com.

On 15 November 2018, Saeksan Or. Kwanmuang won the Rajadamnern lightweight title (135 lbs.) against Panpayak Sitchefboontham.
On 29 May 2019, Saeksan defended the Rajadamnern lightweight title (135 lbs.) against Kaonar Sor.Jor.Tongprajin. On March 5, 2020, he successfully defended the title against Thanonchai Thanakorngym, winning by 3rd-round KO.

As of 1 August 2020, he is ranked the #8 bantamweight kickboxer in the world by Combat Press.

Titles and accomplishments
Sports Authority of Thailand
 2015 Sports Authority of Thailand Fighter of the Year
Rajadamnern Stadium
2011 Rajadamnern Stadium Fight of the Year (vs. Kaimukkao Por.Thairongruangkamai)
2012 Rajadamnern Stadium Fight of the Year (Dec 22nd vs. Singtongnoi Por.Telakun)
2015 Rajadamnern Stadium Fight of the Year (Feb 12th vs. Thanonchai Thanakorngym)
2015 Rajadamnern Stadium Fighter of the Year
2018 Rajadamnern Stadium Lightweight Champion (135 lbs)
2019 Rajadamnern Stadium Fight of the Year (Sep 12th vs. Rodtang Jitmuangnon)
2020 Rajadamnern Stadium Lightweight Champion (135 lbs)
Siam Omnoi Stadium 
 2020 Omnoi Stadium 140 lbs Champion
WBC Muaythai
2018 WBC Muaythai Super-Lightweight World Championship (140 lbs)
 2018 WBC Muay Thai Fight of the Year (February 26 vs. Panpayak Sitchefboontham)
IBF Muaythai
2017 IBF Muaythai Lightweight World Championship (135 lbs)
Kunlun Fight 
2017 Kunlun Fight 61.5kg 8 Man Tournament Champion
Muay Thai Warriors
2012 Muay Thai Warriors Featherweight Champion (Two Title Defenses)
Channel 7 Boxing Stadium 
2010 Channel 7 Super-Bantamweight Champion (122 lbs)

Fight record

|-  style="background:#cfc;"
| 2023-03-17|| Win ||align=left| Silviu Vitez ||  ONE Friday Fights 9, Lumpinee Stadium || Bangkok, Thailand || Decision (Unanimous) || 3 || 3:00
|-  style="background:#cfc;"
| 2023-01-20|| Win ||align=left| Tyson Harrison ||  ONE Friday Fights 1, Lumpinee Stadium || Bangkok, Thailand || Decision (Split) || 3 ||3:00 
|-  style="background:#cfc"
| 2022-12-06 || Win ||align=left| Khunhanlek Kiatcharoenchai||Muay Thai Lumpinee Pitaktam, Lumpinee Stadium || Bangkok, Thailand|| Decision || 5 || 3:00
|-  style="background:#c5d2ea;"
| 2022-11-06|| Draw||align=left| Lao Chetra || Kun Khmer All Star || Phnom Penh, Cambodia || Decision || 3||3:00
|-  style="background:#cfc"
| 2022-09-22 || Win ||align=left| Prabsuk Siopol|| || Surat Thani province, Thailand|| Decision || 5 || 3:00
|-  style="background:#cfc"
| 2022-08-02 ||Win ||align=left| Petchmuangsri Tded99 || Birthday Pitaktham Super Fight || Songkhla province, Thailand || Decision ||5  ||3:00 
|-  style="background:#cfc;"
| 2022-06-15|| Win ||align=left| Mathias Gallo Cassarino|| Palangmai, Rajadamnern Stadium || Bangkok, Thailand || Decision || 5 || 3:00
|-  style="background:#c5d2ea;"
| 2022-05-21|| Draw||align=left| Lao Chetra ||  || Pahang, Malaysia || Decision || 5||3:00
|-  style="background:#fbb;"
| 2022-04-23|| Loss ||align=left| Nico Carrillo || Siam Warriors || Cork City, Ireland || Decision (Unanimous)|| 5||3:00

|-  style="background:#cfc;"
| 2022-03-11|| Win ||align=left| Petchmahachon Jitmuangnon || Pitaktham + Sor.Sommai + Palangmai || Songkhla province, Thailand ||  Decision || 5||3:00
|-  style="background:#fbb;"
| 2021-12-30|| Loss ||align=left| Patakthep Pakbangkakaw  || Muay Thai SAT Super Fight WiteetinThai || Phuket, Thailand || Decision || 5 ||3:00 
|-  style="background:#fbb;"
| 2021-11-26|| Loss ||align=left| Thanonchai Fairtex || Muay Thai Moradok Kon Thai + Rajadamnern Super Fight || Buriram, Thailand || Decision || 5 || 3:00
|-  style="background:#fbb;"
| 2021-10-03|| Loss ||align=left| Kulabdam Sor.Jor.Piek-U-Thai || Channel 7 Stadium || Bangkok, Thailand || Decision || 5 || 3:00
|-  style="background:#fbb;"
| 2021-04-02|| Loss ||align=left| Petchmahachon Jitmuangnon || Pitaktam, Lumpinee Stadium || Bangkok, Thailand ||Decision ||5 ||3:00
|-  style="background:#fbb;"
| 2020-11-17|| Loss||align=left| Yodlekpet Or. Pitisak || Sor.Sommai, CentralPlaza Nakhon Ratchasima|| Nakhon Ratchasima, Thailand ||Decision ||5 ||3:00
|-  style="background:#fbb;"
| 2020-10-10|| Loss ||align=left| Kongklai AnnyMuayThai|| Siam Omnoi Stadium || Bangkok, Thailand || Decision (Unanimous)|| 5 || 3:00
|-
! style=background:white colspan=9 |
|-  style="background:#fbb;"
| 2020-09-10|| Loss ||align=left| Kongklai AnnyMuayThai|| Sor.Sommai Birthday, Rajadamnern Stadium || Bangkok, Thailand || KO (Right Cross) || 4||
|-  style="background:#cfc;"
| 2020-07-18|| Win ||align=left| Thanonchai Thanakorngym || Siam Omnoi Stadium || Bangkok, Thailand || Decision || 5 || 3:00
|-
! style=background:white colspan=9 |
|-  style="background:#cfc;"
| 2020-03-05|| Win ||align=left| Thanonchai Thanakorngym || Rajadamnern Stadium || Bangkok, Thailand || KO (Right Elbow) || 3 ||
|-
! style=background:white colspan=9 |
|-  style="background:#CCFFCC;"
| 2020-01-31|| Win ||align=left| Thanonchai Thanakorngym || Phuket Super Fight Real Muay Thai || Mueang Phuket District, Thailand || Decision || 5 || 3:00
|-  style="background:#FFBBBB;"
| 2019-12-23 || Loss||align=left| Rungkit Wor.Sanprapai || Rajadamnern Stadium || Bangkok, Thailand || Decision (Unanimous)|| 5 || 3:00
|-  style="background:#FFBBBB;"
| 2019-11-07|| Loss ||align=left| Kaonar P.K.SaenchaiMuaythaiGym|| Ruamponkon Prachin ||Prachinburi, Thailand|| Decision || 5 || 3:00
|-  style="background:#FFBBBB;"
| 2019-09-12|| Loss||align=left| Rodtang Jitmuangnon || Rajadamnern Stadium || Bangkok, Thailand || Decision (Unanimous)|| 5 ||3:00
|-  style="background:#FFBBBB;"
| 2019-08-16 ||Loss ||align=left| Rodtang Jitmuangnon || Supit + Sor. Sommai Birthday Fights || Songkhla, Thailand ||Decision || 5 ||3:00
|-  style="background:#FFBBBB;"
| 2019-07-21 || Loss ||align=left| Taiju Shiratori || Rise World Series 2019 Semi Finals || Osaka, Japan || Decision (Unanimous)|| 3 || 3:00
|- style="background:#cfc;"
| 2019-05-29|| Win || align="left" | Kaonar P.K.SaenchaiMuaythaiGym || Rajadamnern Stadium || Bangkok, Thailand|| Decision || 5 || 3:00
|-
! style=background:white colspan=9 |
|- style="background:#cfc;"
| 2019-03-10|| Win || align="left" | Taiga || Rise World Series 2019 First Round ||Tokyo, Japan|| Decision (Unanimous) || 3 || 3:00
|-  style="background:#CCFFCC;"
| 2018-12-20|| Win||align=left| Yodlekpet Or. Pitisak ||Rajadamnern Stadium || Bangkok, Thailand || Decision || 5 || 3:00
|-  style="background:#CCFFCC;"
| 2018-11-15|| Win||align=left| Panpayak Sitchefboontham ||Rajadamnern Stadium || Bangkok, Thailand || Decision || 5 || 3:00
|-
! style=background:white colspan=9 |
|-  style="background:#FFBBBB;"
| 2018-09-27 || Loss ||align=left| Kaonar P.K.SaenchaiMuaythaiGym || Rajadamnern Stadium || Bangkok, Thailand || Decision || 5 || 3:00
|-  style="background:#CCFFCC;"
| 2018-09-04 || Win ||align=left| Muangthai PKSaenchaimuaythaigym ||Lumpinee Stadium || Bangkok, Thailand || Decision || 5 || 3:00
|-  style="background:#FFBBBB;"
| 2018-07-25 || Loss ||align=left| Kaonar P.K.SaenchaiMuaythaiGym || Rajadamnern Stadium || Bangkok, Thailand || Decision || 5 || 3:00
|-
|-  style="background:#c5d2ea;"
| 2018-06-28 || Draw ||align=left| Kaonar P.K.SaenchaiMuaythaiGym || Rajadamnern Stadium || Bangkok, Thailand || Decision || 5 || 3:00
|-
|-  style="background:#FFBBBB;"
| 2018-05-13 || Loss ||align=left| Zhao Chongyang || Kunlun Fight 74 - 61.5kg 8 Man Tournament, Quarter Finals || Jinan, China|| Decision (Majority) || 3 || 3:00
|-
|-  style="background:#CCFFCC;"
| 2018-04-28 || Win ||align=left| Rodlek PKSaenchaimuaythaigym || Phoenix 7 Phuket, Patong Boxing Stadium || Phuket, Thailand || Decision || 5 ||3:00
|-
! style=background:white colspan=9 |
|-  style="background:#CCFFCC;"
| 2018-03-22 || Win||align=left| Panpayak Sitchefboontham ||Rajadamnern Stadium || Bangkok, Thailand || Decision || 5 || 3:00
|-  style="background:#FFBBBB;"
| 2018-02-26 || Loss ||align=left| Panpayak Sitchefboontham ||Rajadamnern Stadium || Bangkok, Thailand || Decision || 5 || 3:00
|-
! style=background:white colspan=9 |
|-  style="background:#CCFFCC;"
| 2017-12-21|| Win||align=left| Panpayak Sitchefboontham ||Rajadamnern Stadium || Bangkok, Thailand || Decision || 5 || 3:00
|-
! style=background:white colspan=9 |
|-  style="background:#CCFFCC;"
| 2017-11-05 || Win||align=left| Wang Wenfeng ||Kunlun Fight 66 - 61.5 kg 8 Man Tournament,Final || Wuhan, China || Decision (Majority) || 3 || 3:00
|-
! style=background:white colspan=9 |
|-  style="background:#CCFFCC;"
| 2017-11-05 || Win||align=left|  Jiao Daobo ||Kunlun Fight 66 - 61.5 kg 8 Man Tournament,Semi Finals || Wuhan, China || Decision (Unanimous) || 3 || 3:00
|-  style="background:#CCFFCC;"
| 2017-11-05 || Win||align=left|  Yang Guang ||Kunlun Fight 66 - 61.5 kg 8 Man Tournament,Quarter Finals || Wuhan, China || Decision (Unanimous) || 3 || 3:00
|-  style="background:#CCFFCC;"
| 2017-09-10|| Win||align=left| Rodlek Jaotalaytong || Phetchbuncha Stadium || Ko Samui, Thailand || Decision || 5 || 3:00
|-  style="background:#FFBBBB;"
| 2017-08-07|| Loss ||align=left| Chadd Collins || Rajadamnern Stadium|| Bangkok, Thailand || Decision || 5 || 3:00
|-  style="background:#CCFFCC;"
| 2017-07-14|| Win||align=left| Muangthai PKSaenchaimuaythaigym || || Ko Samui, Thailand || Decision || 5 || 3:00
|-  style="background:#FFBBBB;"
| 2017-05-31|| Loss ||align=left| Panpayak Jitmuangnon ||Rajadamnern Stadium || Bangkok, Thailand || Decision || 5 || 3:00
|-  style="background:#CCFFCC;"
| 2017-05-03|| Win||align=left| Superbank Mor Ratanabandit ||Rajadamnern Stadium || Bangkok, Thailand || Decision || 5 || 3:00
|-  style="background:#FFBBBB;"
| 2017-02-22|| Loss ||align=left| Rodlek Jaotalaytong ||Rajadamnern Stadium || Bangkok, Thailand || Decision || 5 || 3:00
|-  style="background:#c5d2ea;"
| 2017-01-26 || Draw ||align=left| Superbank Mor Ratanabandit || Rajadamnern Stadium || Bangkok, Thailand || Decision || 5 || 3:00
|-  style="background:#CCFFCC;"
| 2016-12-22|| Win||align=left| Yodlekpet Or. Pitisak ||Rajadamnern Stadium || Bangkok, Thailand || Decision || 5 || 3:00
|-  style="background:#FFBBBB;"
| 2016-11-14|| Loss ||align=left| Superlek Kiatmuu9||Rajadamnern Stadium || Bangkok, Thailand || Decision || 5 || 3:00
|-  style="background:#FFBBBB;"
| 2016-09-23|| Loss ||align=left| Superlek Kiatmuu9 ||Lumpinee Stadium || Bangkok, Thailand || Decision || 5 || 3:00
|-
! style=background:white colspan=9 |
|-  style="background:#CCFFCC;"
| 2016-08-05|| Win||align=left| Rodlek Jaotalaytong || Kiatpetch Show || Hat Yai, Thailand || Decision || 5 || 3:00
|-  style="background:#CCFFCC;"
| 2016-07-03|| Win||align=left| Sammon Decker || MAX Muay Thai Stadium || Pattaya, Thailand || Decision || 5 || 3:00
|-  style="background:#FFBBBB;"
| 2016-06-03|| Loss ||align=left| Rodlek Jaotalaytong ||Lumpinee Stadium || Bangkok, Thailand || Decision || 5 || 3:00
|-  style="background:#CCFFCC;"
| 2016-02-24|| Win||align=left| Thaksinlek Kiatniwat||Rajadamnern Stadium || Bangkok, Thailand || Decision || 5 || 3:00
|-  style="background:#FFBBBB;"
| 2016-01-24|| Loss ||align=left| Thanonchai Thanakorngym || Samui Festival|| Koh Samui, Thailand || Decision || 5 || 3:00
|-  style="background:#FFBBBB;"
| 2015-12-23|| Loss ||align=left| Sangmanee Sor Tienpo || Rajadamnern Stadium || Bangkok, Thailand || Decision || 5 || 3:00
|-  style="background:#CCFFCC;"
| 2015-11-10|| Win||align=left| Muangthai PKSaenchaimuaythaigym ||Lumpinee Stadium || Bangkok, Thailand || Decision || 5 || 3:00
|-  style="background:#CCFFCC;"
| 2015-09-10|| Win||align=left| Genji Umeno ||Rajadamnern Stadium || Bangkok, Thailand || Decision || 5 || 3:00
|-  style="background:#CCFFCC;"
| 2015-08-13|| Win||align=left|  Songkom Nayoksanya ||Rajadamnern Stadium || Bangkok, Thailand || Decision || 5 || 3:00
|-  style="background:#CCFFCC;"
| 2015-07-01|| Win||align=left| Andrei Zayats|| T-One Muay Thai || Beijing, China || TKO (Left Body Knee)|| 3 || 0:20
|-  style="background:#c5d2ea;"
| 2015-06-04 || Draw ||align=left| Thanonchai Thanakorngym || Rajadamnern Stadium || Bangkok, Thailand || Decision || 5 || 3:00
|-  style="background:#CCFFCC;"
| 2015-05-01 || Win ||align=left| Muangthai PKSaenchaimuaythaigym || || Thailand || Decision || 5 || 3:00
|-  style="background:#FFBBBB;"
| 2015-02-12 || Loss ||align=left| Thanonchai Thanakorngym || Rajadamnern Stadium || Bangkok, Thailand || Decision || 5 || 3:00
|-  style="background:#CCFFCC;"
| 2014-12-24|| Win||align=left| Songkom Nayoksanya||Rajadamnern Stadium || Bangkok, Thailand || Decision || 5 || 3:00
|-  style="background:#FFBBBB;"
| 2014-11-25|| Loss||align=left| Phetmorakot Wor Sangprapai ||Lumpinee Stadium || Bangkok, Thailand || Decision || 5 || 3:00
|-  style="background:#CCFFCC;"
| 2014-09-11 || Win||align=left| Kongsak Saenchaimuaythaigym ||Rajadamnern Stadium || Bangkok, Thailand || Decision || 5 || 3:00
|-  style="background:#CCFFCC;"
| 2014-08-13 || Win||align=left| Phetmorakot Wor Sangprapai ||Rajadamnern Stadium || Bangkok, Thailand || Decision || 5 || 3:00
|-  style="background:#c5d2ea;"
| 2014-06-12 || Draw ||align=left| Superbank Mor Ratanabandit || Rajadamnern Stadium || Bangkok, Thailand || Decision || 5 || 3:00
|-  style="background:#FFBBBB;"
| 2014-05-02 || Loss ||align=left| Pakorn PKSaenchaimuaythaigym || Lumpinee Stadium || Bangkok, Thailand || Decision || 5 || 3:00
|-  style="background:#CCFFCC;"
| 2014-04-04 || Win||align=left| Pakorn PKSaenchaimuaythaigym || Petyindee and Onesongchai Promotions || Songkla, Thailand || Decision || 5 || 3:00 
|-  style="background:#CCFFCC;"
| 2013-11-08|| Win ||align=left| Penake Sitnumnoi || Lumpinee Stadium || Bangkok, Thailand || KO (Overhand Right)|| 2 || 1:40
|-  style="background:#CCFFCC;"
| 2013-10-11|| Win ||align=left| Kaimukkao Por.Thairongruangkamai || Lumpinee Stadium || Bangkok, Thailand || KO (Left Elbow)|| 1 || 3:00
|-  style="background:#CCFFCC;"
| 2013-07-26|| Win ||align=left| Kuan Shunping || Muay Thai Warriors || Bangkok, Thailand || KO (Jumping Knee to the Body) || 1 || 2:20
|-
! style=background:white colspan=9 |
|-  style="background:#CCFFCC;"
| 2013-05-31|| Win ||align=left| Detnarong Wor Sangprapai || Petyindee and Onesongchai Promotions || Koh Samui, Thailand || Decision || 5 || 3:00
|-  style="background:#FFBBBB;"
| 2013-05-10 || Loss ||align=left| Petpanomrung Kiatmuu9  || Lumpinee Stadium || Bangkok, Thailand || Decision || 5 || 3:00
|-  style="background:#CCFFCC;"
| 2013-04-05 || Win ||align=left| Stephen Meleady || Muay Thai Warriors || China || KO (Spinning Back Elbow) || 4 || 0:52
|-
! style=background:white colspan=9 |
|-  style="background:#CCFFCC;"
| 2013-02-21 || Win||align=left| Singtongnoi Por.Telakun ||Rajadamnern Stadium || Bangkok, Thailand || Decision || 5 || 3:00
|-  style="background:#c5d2ea"
| 2012-12-24|| Draw||align=left|  Pettawee Sor Kittichai || Rajadamnern Stadium || Bangkok, Thailand || Decision || 5 || 3:00
|-  style="background:#FFBBBB;"
| 2012-11-30|| Loss||align=left| Singtongnoi Por.Telakun || Lumpinee Stadium || Bangkok, Thailand || Decision || 5 || 3:00
|-  style="background:#CCFFCC;"
| 2012-11-09 || Win ||align=left| Singtongnoi Por.Telakun || Lumpinee Stadium || Bangkok, Thailand || Decision || 5 || 3:00
|-  style="background:#FFBBBB;"
| 2012-09-12|| Loss||align=left| Kongsak Saenchaimuaythaigym || Rajadamnern Stadium || Bangkok, Thailand || Decision || 5 || 3:00
|-  style="background:#CCFFCC;"
| 2012-08-19 || Win ||align=left| Sergio Wielzen || Muay Thai Warriors || China || KO (Right elbow) || 3 ||
|-
! style=background:white colspan=9 |
|-  style="background:#CCFFCC;"
| 2012-05-17|| Win ||align=left| Yodwicha Por Boonsit || Rajadamnern Stadium || Bangkok, Thailand || Decision || 5 || 3:00
|-  style="background:#CCFFCC;"
| 2012-04-03 || Win ||align=left| Thongchai Sitsongpeenong || Lumpinee Stadium || Bangkok, Thailand || Decision || 5 || 3:00
|-  style="background:#CCFFCC;"
| 2012-03-09 || Win ||align=left| Thongchai Sitsongpeenong || Lumpinee Stadium || Bangkok, Thailand || Decision || 5 || 3:00
|-  style="background:#FFBBBB;"
| 2012-01-17|| Loss||align=left| Penake Sitnumnoi || Lumpinee Stadium || Bangkok, Thailand || Decision || 5 || 3:00
|-  style="background:#FFBBBB;"
| 2011-12-22|| Loss||align=left| Singtongnoi Por.Telakun || Rajadamnern Stadium || Bangkok, Thailand || Decision || 5 || 3:00
|-  style="background:#CCFFCC;"
| 2011-09-01 || Win ||align=left| Kaimukkao Por.Thairongruangkamai  || Rajadamnern Stadium || Bangkok, Thailand || KO (Straight Right)|| 2 || 1:10 
|-  style="background:#FFBBBB;"
| 2011-04-28|| Loss||align=left| Tapaotong Eminentair || Rajadamnern Stadium || Bangkok, Thailand || Decision || 5 || 3:00
|-  style="background:#FFBBBB;"
| 2011-03-31|| Loss||align=left| Rungruanglek Lukprabat || Rajadamnern Stadium || Bangkok, Thailand || Decision || 5 || 3:00
|-  style="background:#CCFFCC;"
| 2010-12-23|| Win||align=left| Farsung Sor.Tawanrong || Rajadamnern Stadium Birthday event || Bangkok, Thailand || TKO || 2 || 
|-  style="background:#CCFFCC;"
| 2010-09-03|| Win||align=left| Ritidet Wor. Wanthavee ||Lumpinee Stadium || Bangkok, Thailand || Decision || 5 || 3:00
|-  style="background:#c5d2ea;"
| 2010-06-27|| Draw||align=left| Ritidet Wor. Wanthavee || Channel 7 Stadium || Bangkok, Thailand || Decision || 5 || 3:00
|-  style="background:#fbb;"
| 2010-04-25|| Loss||align=left| Kaodaeng SuraphitFarm || Channel 7 Stadium || Bangkok, Thailand || Decision || 5 || 3:00
|-  style="background:#CCFFCC;"
| 2010-03-07|| Win||align=left| Metawee Wor.Sangprapai || Channel 7 Stadium || Bangkok, Thailand || Decision || 5 || 3:00
|-
! style=background:white colspan=9 |
|-  style="background:#FFBBBB;"
| 2009-11-23 || Loss ||align=left| Tomas Sor. Chaijaroen || Rajadamnern Stadium || Bangkok, Thailand || Decision  || 5 || 3:00
|-  style="background:#CCFFCC;"
| 2009-10-12|| Win||align=left| Lookton Aikbangzai ||Rajadamnern Stadium || Bangkok, Thailand || Decision || 5 || 3:00
|-  style="background:#CCFFCC;"
| 2009-08-31|| Win||align=left| Rungrat Tor.Pitakkonkan ||Rajadamnern Stadium || Bangkok, Thailand || Decision || 5 || 3:00
|-  style="background:#CCFFCC;"
| 2009-05-25|| Win||align=left| Tomas Sor. Chaijaroen ||Rajadamnern Stadium || Bangkok, Thailand || Decision || 5 || 3:00

|-  style="background:#CCFFCC;"
| 2009-05-01|| Win||align=left| Nongbeer Choknamwong ||Lumpinee Stadium || Bangkok, Thailand || Decision || 5 || 3:00
|-  style="background:#CCFFCC;"
| 2009-02-02|| Win||align=left| Jampatong Mueangsima ||Rajadamnern Stadium || Bangkok, Thailand || Decision || 5 || 3:00
|-  style="background:#CCFFCC;"
| 2008-12-10|| Win||align=left| Doungpichid Or. Siripon ||Rajadamnern Stadium || Bangkok, Thailand || Decision || 5 || 3:00

|-  style="background:#cfc;"
| 2008-09-19|| Win ||align=left| Kongsak Sitboonmee || Lumpinee Stadium || Bangkok, Thailand || Decision || 5 || 3:00

|-  style="background:#CCFFCC;"
| 2008-07-29 || Win ||align=left| Natthapon Por Puanruamsang || Phetyindee Fights, Lumpinee Stadium || Bangkok, Thailand || Decision || 5 || 3:00
|-  style="background:#CCFFCC;"
| 2008-05-02 || Win ||align=left| Liemphet Sitboonmee || Lumpinee Stadium || Bangkok, Thailand || Decision || 5 || 3:00
|-  style="background:#CCFFCC;"
| 2008-03-11 || Win ||align=left| Kaotam Lookprabaht || Wanboonya Fights, Lumpinee Stadium || Bangkok, Thailand || Decision || 5 || 3:00
|-  style="background:#FFBBBB;"
| 2008-02-13 || Loss ||align=left| Sitthichai Sitsongpeenong || Sor Sommay Fights, Rajadamnern Stadium || Bangkok, Thailand || Decision  || 5 || 3:00
|-  style="background:#FFBBBB;"
| 2007-12-14 || Loss ||align=left| Chanasuk Sitpalangnum|| Phetsupapan, Lumpinee Stadium || Bangkok, Thailand || Decision  || 5 || 3:00
|-  style="background:#fbb;"
| 2007-09-28|| Loss||align=left| Pongsiri Por.Siripong || Lumpinee Stadium || Bangkok, Thailand || Decision || 5 || 3:00
|-
! style=background:white colspan=9 |
|-  style="background:#CCFFCC;"
| 2007-07-23|| Win||align=left| Silarit Sor.Suradeth ||Rajadamnern Stadium || Bangkok, Thailand || Decision || 5 || 3:00
|-  style="background:#cfc;"
| 2007-06-22|| Win||align=left| Pongsiri Por.Siripong || Phetsupapan, Lumpinee Stadium || Bangkok, Thailand || Decision || 5 || 3:00
|-  style="background:#CCFFCC;"
| 2007-04-23|| Win||align=left| Pongsiri Por.Siripong ||Rajadamnern Stadium || Bangkok, Thailand || Decision || 5 || 3:00
|-  style="background:#CCFFCC;"
| 2007-03-23|| Win||align=left| Mungkornkhao Sor.Saksan ||Lumpinee Stadium || Bangkok, Thailand || Decision || 5 || 3:00
|-  style="background:#CCFFCC;"
| 2006-12-08|| Win||align=left| Tawanchay Sakhiranchai ||Lumpinee Stadium || Bangkok, Thailand || Decision || 5 || 3:00
|-  style="background:#CCFFCC;"
| 2006-10-13|| Win||align=left| Sanganan Lookbanyai ||Lumpinee Stadium || Bangkok, Thailand || Decision || 5 || 3:00
|-  style="background:#CCFFCC;"
| 2006-08-28|| Win||align=left| Wanchailak Kiatphukham ||Lumpinee Stadium || Bangkok, Thailand || Decision || 5 || 3:00
|-  style="background:#CCFFCC;"
| 2006-04-07|| Win||align=left| Wanchailak Kiatphukham ||Lumpinee Stadium || Bangkok, Thailand || Decision || 5 || 3:00
|-  style="background:#CCFFCC;"
| 2006-03-17|| Win||align=left| Wanchailak Kiatphukham ||Lumpinee Stadium || Bangkok, Thailand || Decision || 5 || 3:00
|-  style="background:#FFBBBB;"
| 2006-02-21|| Loss ||align=left| Sripattanalak Kiat Por.Chaideat ||Lumpinee Stadium || Bangkok, Thailand || Decision || 5 || 3:00
|-  style="background:#CCFFCC;"
| 2005-12-23|| Win||align=left| Artapon Por.Khumpai ||Lumpinee Stadium || Bangkok, Thailand || Decision || 5 || 3:00
|-
| colspan=9 | Legend:

References

Saeksan Or. Kwanmuang
Living people
1989 births
Kunlun Fight kickboxers
ONE Championship kickboxers 
Saeksan Or. Kwanmuang
Kunlun Fight kickboxing champions